The Canton of Tonnay-Boutonne is a former canton of the Charente-Maritime department in France. It was disbanded following the French canton reorganisation which came into effect in March 2015. It consisted of 11 communes, which joined the canton of Saint-Jean-d'Angély in 2015. It had 3,417 inhabitants (2012). The lowest point is the river Boutonne near Puy-du-Lac (1 m), the highest point is at Nachamps at 66 m. The seat of the canton was Tonnay-Boutonne.

Communes

The canton comprised the following communes:

Annezay
Chantemerle-sur-la-Soie
Chervettes
Nachamps
Puy-du-Lac
Puyrolland
Saint-Crépin
Saint-Laurent-de-la-Barrière
Saint-Loup
Tonnay-Boutonne
Torxé

Population history

See also 

 Cantons of the Charente-Maritime department

References

Former cantons of Charente-Maritime
2015 disestablishments in France
States and territories disestablished in 2015